Bao Rong (fl. early 8th century) was a Chinese poet of the Tang dynasty. He was a native of Yanling (modern Danyang, Jiangsu province). He is traditionally grouped with He Zhizhang, Zhang Xu, and Zhang Ruoxu as the Four Poets of Central Wu, the Lower Yangtze region. He served as a minor official in the Ministry of Justice of the Tang government, and was a close friend of the poet Meng Haoran. Bao Rong's two sons Bao He and Bao Ji were also accomplished poets. The trio is collectively called the "Three Baos".

The Complete Tang Poems includes eight of his poems. His biography is included in the Yuan dynasty work Biographies of Tang Talents by Xin Wenfang.

References

Bibliography

Tang dynasty poets
8th-century Chinese poets
Writers from Zhenjiang
Poets from Jiangsu
People from Danyang